Eastwood railway station is located on the Main Northern line, serving the Sydney suburb of Eastwood. It is served by Sydney Trains T9 Northern Line. As of 30 September 2018, Central Coast & Newcastle Line trains no longer stop at this station.

History
The station opened as Dundas on 17 September 1886 on the single track line. It was renamed Eastwood on 1 September 1887. The line through Eastwood was subsequently duplicated and has since been quadruplicated. In 2004, the platforms were extended towards Epping to allow 8-car Intercity trains to service the platforms.

The station subway is accessible by non-paying members of the public, although this was separated from the station concourse by a fence. In February 2007, the fence was removed to allow construction of smartcard readers for the Tcard system.

In March 2006 it was revealed, that asbestos fibre had been disturbed by contractors installing cabling for the Tcard project in the roof of the ticketing office at the station. The station offices were temporarily closed and replaced by a temporary booking office in the station carpark.

In June 2008, an upgrade to the station including lifts was complete.

Platforms and services

Transport links
Busways operate eight routes via Eastwood station:
515: to Top Ryde
521: to Parramatta station
541: to Epping station
544: Macquarie Centre to Auburn station
545: Macquarie Park to Parramatta station
551: to Marsfield

Eastwood station is served by one NightRide route:
N80: Hornsby station to Town Hall station

Trackplan

References

External links

Eastwood station details Transport for New South Wales
Eastwood Station Public Transport Map Transport for NSW

Easy Access railway stations in Sydney
Railway stations in Sydney
Railway stations in Australia opened in 1886
Main North railway line, New South Wales
Eastwood, New South Wales